"Turn Off the Light" is a 2001 song by Nelly Furtado.

Turn Off the Light may also refer to:

Music

Albums and EPs
 Turn Off the Light (album), a 2019 album by Kim Petras
 Turn Off the Light, Vol. 1, a 2018 EP by Kim Petras
 Turn Off the Lights, a 2019 EP by Dog Blood

Songs

 "Turn Off the Light", a 2018 song by Kim Petras from Turn Off the Light, Vol. 1
 "Turn Off the Lights", a 1979 song by Teddy Pendergrass
 "Turn Off the Lights", a 1987 song by World Class Wreckin' Cru
 "Turn Off the Lights", a 2011 song by Panic! at the Disco from the Album Vices & Virtues

Other
 Turn off the Light!, a Russian satirical television program
 Turn Off the Lights (extension), a browser extension

See also
 "Turn the Lights Off", a song by Kato featuring Jon
 Turn Out the Lights (disambiguation)